Trischizostoma is a genus of crustaceans belonging to the monotypic family Trischizostomatidae.

The genus has almost cosmopolitan distribution.

Species:

Trischizostoma barnardi 
Trischizostoma christochelatum 
Trischizostoma circulare 
Trischizostoma costai 
Trischizostoma cristochelata 
Trischizostoma crosnieri 
Trischizostoma denticulatum 
Trischizostoma longirostre 
Trischizostoma longirostrum 
Trischizostoma macrochela 
Trischizostoma nascaense 
Trischizostoma nicaeense 
Trischizostoma paucispinosum 
Trischizostoma raschi 
Trischizostoma remipes 
Trischizostoma richeri 
Trischizostoma serratum 
Trischizostoma tanjae 
Trischizostoma tohokuense 
Trischizostoma unam

References

Amphipoda